Hannah Landheer (born 20 October 2002) is a Dutch cricketer. She made her Women's Twenty20 International (WT20I) debut for the Netherlands women's cricket team on 26 June 2019, against Scotland, in the 2019 ICC Women's Qualifier Europe tournament.

In August 2019, she was named in Netherlands' squad for the 2019 ICC Women's World Twenty20 Qualifier tournament in Scotland. In October 2021, she was named in the Dutch team for the 2021 Women's Cricket World Cup Qualifier tournament in Zimbabwe.

References

External links
 

2002 births
Living people
Dutch women cricketers
Netherlands women Twenty20 International cricketers
Place of birth missing (living people)
21st-century Dutch women